Paul Thompson (born 13 May 1951) is an English drummer, who is best known as a member of the rock band Roxy Music. He is a member of Andy Mackay's project with the Metaphors and joined Lindisfarne in 2013. He was also the drummer for Oi! band Angelic Upstarts and the American alternative rock band Concrete Blonde.

Early life and education
Thompson was born in Newcastle upon Tyne, Northumberland. He lived in Jarrow, north-east England from the age of six months and attended West Simonside Infants and Junior School.

Career
In 1965, Thompson joined The Tyme who played at local youth clubs. His next group was a local band called The Urge which he joined when 17 years old. Fatigue from performing with them seven nights a week in local clubs and pubs led him to fall asleep on his job as an apprentice metalworker, resulting in his dismissal. Alongside John Miles he became a member of The Influence.  

Thompson joined Roxy Music in 1971 and was credited as drummer on six albums, as well as touring and performing on solo records with his bandmates Bryan Ferry, Phil Manzanera, and Andy Mackay

In 1980, Thompson took leave from Roxy Music due to an arm injury. Later that year he left the band, owing to musical differences between himself and Bryan Ferry. During this period Thompson played with rock band Concrete Blonde.

In 2001, he reunited with fellow Roxy Music band members for a tour. He also toured with Ferry, supporting his Frantic album in 2003 and appeared at the Isle of Wight Festival 2005 on 11 June 2005 with Ferry. During this period Thompson played live gigs with Andy Mackay and The Metaphors and was credited on their self released live CD London! Paris! New York! Rome! in 2009. He joined the Newcastle upon Tyne Lindisfarne in 2013.

Thompson was inducted into the Rock and Roll Hall of Fame in 2019 as a member of Roxy Music.

Influence and following
Drummer Roger Taylor of the new wave band Duran Duran has stated that Thompson's drumming was a big influence over his development. Fans of Thompson nicknamed him "The Great Paul Thompson", because of his drumming skills and power.

Other interests
In 1987, Thompson joined the Royal Auxiliary Air Force. As a member of 2624 Squadron, based in Oxfordshire, he attained the rank of corporal before leaving the RAuxAF in 1993.

References

External links
 Paul Thompson at Discogs
 
 Vivaroxymusic.com
 

1951 births
20th-century English musicians
21st-century English musicians
Art rock musicians
Concrete Blonde members
English rock drummers
The Gary Moore Band members
Glam rock musicians
Living people
Musicians from Newcastle upon Tyne
People from Jarrow
Musicians from Tyne and Wear
Roxy Music members
20th-century drummers
21st-century drummers
801 (band) members
Lindisfarne (band) members